Tadeusz Kacik (6 October 1946 – 17 May 1988) was a Polish ice hockey player. He played for Podhale Nowy Targ and KTH Krynicaduring his career. He also played for the Polish national team at the 1972 Winter Olympics and multiple World Championships. Kacik won the Polish league championship six times in his career, all with Podhale. In 1971 he was voted the best player in Poland. His grandson, Patryk Wronka, also plays ice hockey and has represented Poland internationally.

References

External links
 

1946 births
1988 deaths
Ice hockey players at the 1972 Winter Olympics
KTH Krynica players
Olympic ice hockey players of Poland
People from Nowy Targ
Podhale Nowy Targ players
Polish ice hockey forwards
Sportspeople from Lesser Poland Voivodeship